San Francisco Ballet dances each year at the  War Memorial Opera House, San Francisco, and tours; this is the list of 2016 San Francisco Ballet repertory season with ballets and casts beginning with the opening night gala, Thursday, January 21, 2016.  The Nutcracker is danced the year before.

Gala  
Thursday, January 21, 2016

The program for the gala 

 "Waltz of the Hours" from Coppélia
 World Premiere "Adagio" from the ballet based on Carmen, by Yuri Possokhov
 Bartok Divertimento
 Tchaikovsky Pas de Deux
 Pas de deux from Carousel (A Dance)
 Pas de deux from Don Quixote, Act III
After intermission, SF Ballet Orchestra performed "Infernal Dance" from The Firebird, in Celebration of San Francisco Ballet Orchestra’s 40th Anniversary.  (No dancers were on stage during this.)
 San Francisco Ballet Premiere Gentle Memories
 Rubies pas de deux
 Solo, by Hans van Manen
 Pas de deux from Swan Lake, Act III
 North American Premiere Pas de deux from Pas/Parts by William Forsythe
 Theme and Variations finale

Programs

Program one, Jan 24 - Feb 5 Mixed program 
 7 for 8 by Helgi Tomasson
 Magrittomania by Yuri Possokhov
 Pas/Parts 2016 by William Forsythe

Program two, Jan 27 - Feb 6 Mixed program 
 Rubies
 Drink to Me Only With Thine Eyes by Mark Morris
 Fearful Symmetries (World Premiere) by Liam Scarlett

Program three, Feb 19 - Feb 28 Full-Length 
 Swan Lake

Program four, Mar 8 - Mar 13 Full-Length 
 Coppélia

Program five, Mar 16 - Mar 22 Mixed program 
 Dances at a Gathering
 Swimmer, by Yuri Possokhov

Program six, Apr 5 - Apr 16 Mixed program 
 Prism by Helgi Tomasson
 Seven Sonatas by Alexei Ratmansky
 Rush© by Christopher Wheeldon

Program seven, Apr 7 - Apr 17 Mixed Program 
 Continuum© by Christopher Wheeldon
 In the Countenance of Kings by Justin Peck
 Theme and Variations

Program eight, Apr 30 - May 8 Full length 
 Onegin

2016 Company Roster
The company of the San Francisco Ballet:

Changes from 2015 season
 Soloist Dana Genshaft retired from dancing and joined the faculty of the San Francisco Ballet School.
 Soloist Clara Blanco left to be both a ballet teacher and head of the classical dance department at Escuela Profesional de Danza de Castilla y León, in Valladolid, Spain.
 Corps member Carolyn Lippert joined the corps de ballet of American Ballet Theatre in December 2015.
 Corps member Raymond Tilton joined Diablo Ballet in Walnut Creek, California.
 Corps member Kristina Lind joined the Dutch National Ballet
 Corps members Thomas Bieszka, Megan Amanda Ehrlich, Lacey Escabar, Emily Kadow, Shannon Marie Rugani, and Benjamin Stewart were removed from the roster for the 2016 season.
 Principals Pascal Molat and Joan Boada announced they would be retiring at the end of the 2016 season.
 Principal Gennadi Nedvigin announced he will retire from dancing in May 2016 to become the artistic director of the Atlanta Ballet.

Promotions and Additions
 San Francisco Ballet announced five promotions, four new Company members, and six apprentices for the 2016 Repertory Season: 
 Soloist Dores André has been promoted to principal dancer.
 Lauren Strongin from Houston Ballet joined as a soloist. 
 Added to the corps de ballet were former SF Ballet Apprentices Samantha Bristow, Benjamin Freemantle, John-Paul Simoens, and Maggie Weirich, as well as Jahna Frantziskonis from Pacific Northwest Ballet, Alessandra Vassallo from Teatro alla Scala, and Kamryn Baldwin from the San Francisco Ballet School. 
 Grace Choi, Blake Kessler, Anastasia Kubanda, Haruo Niyama, Chisako Oga, and Francisco Sebastião of the San Francisco Ballet School were promoted to the rank of apprentice.
 However, Alessandra Vassallo did not appear on the roster on www.sfballet.org during the 2016.

Dancers

Principal Dancers

Principal character dancers

Ricardo Bustamante
Val Caniparoli

Rubén Martín Cintas

Anita Paciotti

Soloists

Sasha De Sola
Daniel Deivison-Oliveira
Carlo Di Lanno
Koto Ishihara
James Sofranko
Jennifer Stahl
Lauren Strongin
Anthony Vincent
Hansuke Yamamoto

Corps de Ballet

Gaetano Amico III
Kamryn Baldwin
Sean Bennett
Kimberly Braylock-Olivier
Samantha Bristow
Kristine Butler
Max Cauthorn 
Thamires Chuvas
Diego Cruz
Isabella DeVivo
Jahna Frantziskonis
Benjamin Freemantle
Jordan Hammond
Jillian Harvey

Esteban Hernandez
Ellen Rose Hummel
Norika Matsuyama
Lee Alex Meyer-Lorey
Steven Morse
Francisco Mungamba
Sean Orza
Lauren Parrott
Elizabeth Powell
Alexander Reneff-Olson
Aaron Renteria
Rebecca Rhodes
Julia Rowe
Emma Rubinowitz

Skyla Schreter
Grace Shibley
Henry Sidford
Miranda Silveira 
John-Paul Simoens
Myles Thatcher
Mingxuan Wang
Wei Wang
Lonnie Weeks
Maggie Weirich
Ami Yuki
WanTing Zhao

Apprentices
 Grace Choi
 Blake Kessler
 Anastasia Kubanda
 Chisako Oga
 Francisco Sebastião

Artistic Staff
Source:

Artistic Director & Principal Choreographer: Helgi Tomasson
Ballet Master & Assistant to the Artistic Director: Ricardo Bustamante
Ballet Masters
Felipe Diaz
Betsy Erickson
Anita Paciotti
Katita Waldo
Company Teachers
Helgi Tomasson
Ricardo Bustamante
Felipe Diaz
Choreographer in Residence: Yuri Possokhov
Music Director and Principal Conductor: Martin West
Other Artistic Staff
Caroline Giese, Artistic Administrator
Alan Takata-Villareal, Logistics Manager
Abby Masters, Assistant to the Artistic Staff

Music Director and Musicians
Music Director & Principal Conductor: Martin West

Strings

Woodwinds

Brass

Percussion

References

External links

San Francisco Ballet
Lists of ballets by company
Ballet
2016 in San Francisco